This is a list of Illinois Fighting Illini football players in the NFL Draft.

Key

Selections

Notes
Dave Wilson was drafted in the 1981 Supplemental Draft.

Notable undrafted players
Note: No drafts held before 1920

References

Illinois

Illinois Fighting Illini NFL Draft